The Noonan–Estevan Highway Border Crossing connects the cities of Noonan, North Dakota and Estevan, Saskatchewan on the Canada–US border. North Dakota Highway 40 on the American side joins Saskatchewan Highway 47 on the Canadian side.

Canadian side
The office operated under the administrative oversight of the Port of North Portal. A facility was not constructed at the border until 1937. The status was upgraded to Port of Estevan in 1950. Canada built its double-canopy border station in 1972. A rebuild plan issued in 2017 has yet to be finalized.

In 2020, the hours changed from being 8am to 9pm (summer) and 9am to 10pm (winter) to 8am to 4pm (summer) and mirroring the US winter hours.

US side
The US Customs office similarly relocated to the border in 1937. The US replaced its red brick border station with a ranch-style facility in 1975, and then demolished that in favor of a large grey modern facility which opened in 2011.

See also
 List of Canada–United States border crossings

References

Canada–United States border crossings
Geography of Saskatchewan
Transport in Estevan
1913 establishments in North Dakota
1913 establishments in Saskatchewan
Buildings and structures in Divide County, North Dakota
Transportation in Divide County, North Dakota